Edward Owen (6 November 1886 – 24 September 1949) was a British athlete, who competed mainly in long-distance races.

Owen competed for Great Britain in the 1908 Summer Olympics, held in London, Great Britain, in the 5 miles, where he won the silver medal. In the 1912 Summer Olympics he was able to win the bronze medal in the 3000 m team event. Born in Manchester, he ran for Salford Harriers and Manchester Athletic Club during his career. He twice won at the AAA Championships (1909 and 1912). He served with the Irish Guards regiment during World War I. After working at Belle Vue Stadium, he went to manage Crayford & Bexleyheath Stadium (another greyhound track) in Bexley. He died in Woolwich.

References

Sources
 Profile at Sports-Reference.com

1886 births
1949 deaths
Sportspeople from Manchester
English male long-distance runners
English people of Welsh descent
Olympic athletes of Great Britain
Olympic silver medallists for Great Britain
Olympic bronze medallists for Great Britain
Olympic silver medalists in athletics (track and field)
Olympic bronze medalists in athletics (track and field)
Athletes (track and field) at the 1908 Summer Olympics
Athletes (track and field) at the 1912 Summer Olympics
Medalists at the 1908 Summer Olympics
Medalists at the 1912 Summer Olympics
Irish Guards soldiers
British Army personnel of World War I